The 2004 North Dakota gubernatorial election took place on 2 November 2004 for the post of Governor of North Dakota. Incumbent Republican Governor John Hoeven was easily re-elected defeating Democratic-NPL former state senator Joe Satrom.

Republican nomination
Incumbent Governor John Hoeven was unopposed for the Republican nomination and accepted the nomination by stating that the economy of North Dakota was his priority.

Democratic-NPL nomination
Former state senator Joe Satrom defeated North Dakota House of Representatives minority leader Merle Boucher for the Democratic-NPL nomination. Satrom began campaigning for the nomination almost a year before the North Dakota Democratic-NPL Convention would choose the parties candidate for Governor. Boucher announced his candidacy in December 2003 but struggled to make up ground against Satrom.

The two candidates debated at the University of North Dakota, just before the convention, with education and the future of the state's youth the main topics. The Democratic-NPL Convention voted by 632 to 341 to endorse Satrom as their candidate for Governor.

General election

Campaign
The two candidates met in three debates during the campaign, during the final debate on 9 October 2004 they clashed over a smoking ban, outmigration and a proposed constitutional amendment to ban same-sex marriage.

Satrom called for North Dakota to introduce a one thousand dollar donation limit, for individuals and political action committees, to avoid any perception of conflict of interest. Hoeven named education, growth and jobs as his priorities but faced anger from some hunting groups over changes to hunt seasons.

Opinion polls gave Hoeven a strong lead over Satrom with one in October 2004 showing Hoeven on 70% as against 22% for Satrom. Hoeven raised far more money than his challenger and even a normally Democratic supporting teachers union, the North Dakota Education Association, endorsed Hoeven for Governor.

Predictions

Results

References

North Dakota
Gubernatorial
2004